Marcelo Michel Leaño (born 14 February 1987) nicknamed “Pep Leaño ” is a Mexican professional football manager.

Career

Necaxa
On 12 May 2018, Leaño was named as the new manager of Liga MX club Necaxa, replacing Ignacio Ambríz; at 31 years old, he is the youngest coach in Liga MX, as well as the only coach in the first division to have never played at professional level.

Personal life
Marcelo Michel Leaño is the nephew of former Tecos F.C. owner José Antonio Leaño. José Antonio Leaño's son, Juan Carlos Leaño, was a professional footballer and captain of Tecos for many years.

Honours
Necaxa
Supercopa MX: 2018

References

1987 births
Living people
Mexican football managers
C.D. Guadalajara managers
Sportspeople from Guadalajara, Jalisco